Southern West Virginia Community and Technical College (Southern) is a public community college with its main campus in Mount Gay, West Virginia. It is part of the West Virginia Community and Technical College System.

History

The school was founded as the Logan and Williamson branches of Marshall College in 1960 and renamed as branches of Marshall University when their mother institution achieved university status in 1961. It had community college jurisdiction over Logan and Mingo counties. In both cases, the schools were housed in the buildings that had been surplussed by the desegregation of public education. The "branch college", as it was often called, sported basketball teams at each of its two campuses.

In 1970, the two branches were merged and became a stand-alone community college. The college's jurisdiction was expanded to include Boone County and Wyoming County. Classes in these counties were held in leased locations until 1971, when a permanent building was constructed in Williamson.

In the 1980s, the college was refocused and permanent buildings were built in each county.

Academics
Southern provides both associate degrees in 2-year fields (career/technical programs) and the first two years of a four-year degree in the anticipation of a transfer to a bachelor's level institution.

The service area of the school was expanded by 1995 legislation that divided West Virginia into eleven districts. Southern serves all of Boone, Lincoln, Logan, McDowell, Mingo, and Wyoming counties.

Approximately 1,100 students are enrolled. Less than half of them attend part-time.

The school has no residential programs and no athletics. It does have school colors, gold and black.

Locations
Campus locations are in Foster, Mount Gay, Williamson and Saulsville.

References

External links
 

Two-year colleges in the United States
West Virginia Community and Technical College System
Education in Boone County, West Virginia
Education in Logan County, West Virginia
Education in Mingo County, West Virginia
Education in Wyoming County, West Virginia
Educational institutions established in 1960
Buildings and structures in Boone County, West Virginia
Buildings and structures in Mingo County, West Virginia
1960 establishments in West Virginia